Keshin may refer to:

Keshin, Japanese term for reincarnation; specifically the physical body of the Buddha that appears in this world
, a 1984 novel by Junichi Watanabe 1985
Keshin (film), a 1986 Japanese film with Hitomi Kuroki, based on the novel
"Keshin" (song), a 2009 song by Masaharu Fukuyama
Keshin, Iran, alternative spelling of Cheshīn, Iran
Sultan of Keshin, old spelling of the lord of Socotra who resided at Qishn on the Yemen mainland
Keshin, old spelling of Qishan (official)
Keshin, the long-haired ascete of Rigveda, Rudra, identified with Shiva